The South Fork Humboldt River is a river in Elko County, Nevada, United States.

Description

The river originates in a fan-shaped group of canyons draining the western slopes of the Ruby Mountains in northeastern Nevada. These headwaters run from Ruby Dome south to King Peak and include Echo, Box, Kleckner, North Furlong, Long, Segunda, Drown, and Rattlesnake Canyons.

Continuing its northwest course, the river merges with the flow of Huntington Creek, passes through the historic area of Twin Bridges, and then enters the more recent South Fork Reservoir, State Park, and South Fork Dam dating from 1988. It then passes through South Fork Canyon, which merges with Tenmile and Dixie creeks' flows. It was here that, on September 25, 1846, the Donner Party wagon train completed the segment of their journey on the Hastings Cutoff, and rejoined the original California Trail.

See also

 List of rivers in Nevada

References

External links

Tributaries of the Humboldt River
Rivers of Elko County, Nevada
Rivers of Nevada
Rivers of the Great Basin